DXID (1566 AM & 101.5 FM) is an Islamic radio station owned and operated by Association for Islamic Development Service Cooperative. The station's studio and FM transmitter are located at AID Comp., Purok Arabic, Brgy. Banale, Pagadian City, and its AM transmitter is located in Tukuran. This serves as the community station for the Islam people.

References

Radio stations in Zamboanga del Sur
Radio stations established in 1995
Islamic radio stations